Al-Harf is a sub-district located in Harf Sufyan District, 'Amran Governorate, Yemen. Al-Harf had a population of 10886 according to the 2004 census.

References 

Sub-districts in Harf Sufyan District